Pronto Cycle Share, branded as Pronto!, was a public bycycle sharing system in Seattle, Washington, that operated from 2014 to 2017. The system, owned initially by a non-profit and later by the Seattle Department of Transportation, included 54 stations in the city's central neighborhoods and 500 bicycles. Motivate (formerly Alta Bike Share) operated the system and Alaska Airlines was the program's presenting sponsor. On March 31, 2017, Pronto shut down operations and disassembly of stations began, with the bicycles being offered to other cities that wish to start a similar system.

History
Pronto launched on October 13, 2014, with 500 bikes in 50 stations available for use in Downtown, South Lake Union, Belltown, Capitol Hill, the U-District, Eastlake, First Hill, Pioneer Square and the International District. It soon ran into major funding issues in 2015 after the City of Seattle put any further fundraising on hold while awaiting council approval to purchase the system.

The City of Seattle finally bought the system for $1.4 million on March 14, 2016, but by this time, the system had become insolvent due to less than expected ridership, revenue and lack of funding. It was originally planned to be replaced with a new bikeshare system using a vendor with electric bicycles, but the new system was cancelled in January 2017, as the city decided to direct bike share’s remaining $3 million in funding dowards Safe Routes to School and other bicycle and pedestrian programs.

On March 31, 2017, Pronto shut down operations and disassembly of stations began, with the bicycles being offered to other cities that wish to start a similar system.

Membership and fees

Use of the Pronto system was based on either annual memberships ($85) or short-term passes of either 24 hours ($8) or 3 days ($16).

Helmet law compliance
Pronto Cycle Share was the first public bicycle sharing system in the United States to operate where a bicycle helmet law applies to cyclists of all ages. To address this, the system installed helmet dispensers at each kiosk, along with a collection bin for used helmets. At the system's launch in October 2014 the helmets were available for free on the honor system. A rental system was put into effect starting in Spring 2015.

Sponsorship
Primary sponsorship for the system was provided by Seattle-based Alaska Airlines, who paid $2.5 million for a 5-year sponsorship that includes their logo on the bikes themselves. Seattle Children's Hospital, Group Health, REI, Vulcan Real Estate and Fred Hutch were among the system's secondary sponsors.

Technology
The Pronto bike share system technology, both hardware and software, was provided by 8D Technologies, who also supply the server technology for BIXI Montréal, Citi Bike in New York City, Santander Cycles in London, Capital Bikeshare in Washington DC, and others.

See also
List of bicycle sharing systems

References

External links

SDOT Bike Share information

2014 establishments in Washington (state)
Community bicycle programs
Cycling in Washington (state)
Cycling in the United States
Organizations based in Seattle
Transportation in Seattle
Defunct companies based in Seattle
2017 disestablishments in Washington (state)
Bicycle sharing in the United States